St. John's South—Mount Pearl (formerly St. John's South) is a federal electoral district in Newfoundland and Labrador, Canada, that has been represented in the House of Commons of Canada since 2004.

Under the proposed 2022 Canadian federal electoral redistribution, this riding would be renamed Cape Spear.

Demographics
Ethnic groups: 99.2% White 
Languages: 98.7% English 
Religions: 52.8% Catholic, 42.4% Protestant, 3.6% no affiliation 
Average income: $25 379

Geography
The district includes the south end of the City of St. John's, the City of Mount Pearl, and the Town of Petty Harbour-Maddox Cove.

The neighbouring ridings are Avalon and St. John's East.

According to Elections Canada, the geographic boundaries of this riding for the 39th General Election are:

 "All that area consisting of:

 (a) that part of the City of St. John's lying southeasterly of the southeasterly limits of the towns of Conception Bay South and Paradise, and southeasterly of a line described as follows: commencing at the intersection of the westerly limit of the City of St. John's with Kenmount Road immediately north of the northwesterly limit of the City of Mount Pearl; thence northeasterly and easterly along said road, Freshwater Road and Longs Hill to Gower Street; thence northeasterly along said street to Kings Bridge Road; thence northerly along said road to Rennie's River; thence generally easterly along said river, Quidi Vidi Lake and the channel known locally as Quidi Vidi Gut to Quidi Vidi Harbour;

 (b) the City of Mount Pearl; and

 (c) the Town of Petty Harbour-Maddox Cove.  Including all islands adjacent to the shoreline of the above-described area."

See also Elections Canada's map of the riding (.PDF).

History
The electoral district was created in 2003: 95.1% of the population of the riding came from St. John's West, and 4.9% from St. John's East ridings. As of the 2012 electoral redistribution, 5% of this riding would be moved to St. John's East, and it would gain 3% from Avalon.

The 2012 federal electoral boundaries redistribution concluded that the electoral boundaries of St. John's South—Mount Pearl should be adjusted, and a modified electoral district of the same name will be contested in future elections. The redefined St. John's South—Mount Pearl had its boundaries legally defined in the 2013 representation order which came into effect upon the call of the 42nd Canadian federal election, scheduled for 19 October 2015.

Members of Parliament

This riding has elected the following Members of Parliament:

Election results

St. John's South—Mount Pearl

2021 general election

2019 general election

2015 general election

2011 general election

2008 general election

2006 general election

St. John's South

2004 general election

Student vote results 
Results of the Canadian student vote.

2019 student vote results

2015 student vote results

2011 student vote results

See also
 List of Canadian federal electoral districts
 Past Canadian electoral districts

References

External links
 St. John's South—Mount Pearl riding from Elections Canada
 Riding history for St. John's South (2003–2004) from the Library of Parliament
 Riding history for St. John's South—Mount Pearl (2004– ) from the Library of Parliament
 Election Financial Reports from Elections Canada

Mount Pearl
Newfoundland and Labrador federal electoral districts
Politics of St. John's, Newfoundland and Labrador